Danijel Sraka (born 22 December 1975) is a Slovenian film director and producer. Sraka directed his first feature film, Friday Night (V Petek Zvecer), at age 22 (film shot in 1998, released in 2000).

In 2001, he established (with Slovenian actor Jernej Kuntner) the first Slovenian stand-up comedy club and show, Nove zvezde komedije.

His first collection of poems entitled Logos Via Ljubezen (Logos Via Love) was published in 1995.

Graduated with honors from Brooks Institute of Photography in 2007. Graduated from AFI Conservatory with MFA degree in Producing in 2009.
He further polished his skills at TV production company Prospect Park and feature film production company Mace Neufeld Productions.

Nowadays, Danijel pursues his dreams as producer and director at a production company Vindicated Dream. He is also a producer and partner at Primo Pictures Entertainment, a multiplatform entertainment company. Primo Pictures Entertainment's current slate of projects include a lost-in-translation drama set in Beijing "Coffee & Tea," a coming of age dramedy "Pancake's Wedding," and a fantasy feature film Fearless Boy.

Lives in Los Angeles, CA, with his wife, theater director and producer, Vesna Hocevar.

Filmography

Director
 2009 - Balicanni,  short film
 2009 - Summer Camp, short film
 2009 - Room 337, short film
 2006 - Filming Jefferey, feature documentary (in post-production)
 2005 - Anniversary, short film
 2004 - Chasing the UFOs, short documentary film
 2004 - Lost Souls, short film
 2000 - Friday Night (V Petek Zvecer), feature film
 1998 - Renaissance, short film

Producer
 2011 - Coffee & Tea,  feature film (in pre-production)
 2011 - Pancake's Wedding,  feature film (in pre-production)
 2011 - Warriors,  short film
 2010/11 - The Dog and the Duck,  feature documentary
 2010 - Lost Girl,  short film
 2009 - Balicanni, short film
 2009 - Summer Camp, short film
 2009 - Echoes, short film
 2008 - Coal For Cole, short film
 2006 - Filming Jefferey, feature documentary (in post-production)
 2000 - Friday Night (V Petek Zvecer), feature film

Writer
 2009 - Balicanni, short film
 2009 - Summer Camp, short film
 2005 - Anniversary, short film
 1998 - Renaissance, short film

External links

Notes

Slovenian film directors
1975 births
Living people
Film people from Ljubljana
Brooks Institute alumni